Robert Wolverstone (1572/3–1624) was a Welsh politician who sat in the House of Commons in 1614.

In 1614, Wolverstone was elected Member of Parliament for Cardigan.

Wolverstone was probably the father or brother of Captain Charles Wolverstone, Governor of Barbados from 1625 to 1629.

References

1570s births
1624 deaths
Members of the Parliament of England (pre-1707) for constituencies in Wales
17th-century Welsh politicians
English MPs 1614